Professor Domhnall MacAuley MD, FRCGP, FFPHMI, FFSEM, FISM (born 1957) is a former physician, a professor of primary health care and a medical journal editor.

After graduating from University College Dublin, MacAuley underwent medical training at the University of Exeter.

He obtained his MD while working as a senior research fellow at Queen's University Belfast.

He obtained a position as professor of primary health care (research) at the University of Ulster in 1997, later becoming an honorary professor.

He has been primary care editor for the British Medical Journal, and was editor of the British Journal of Sports Medicine from  1995 to 2000. He became Consultant-Associate Editor at the Canadian Medical Association Journal in 2013.

References

External links 

 

Alumni of University College Dublin
Alumni of the University of Exeter
Academics of Ulster University
1957 births
Place of birth missing (living people)
Living people
Medical journal editors

Fellows of the Royal College of General Practitioners